Membership of the United Nations Security Council is held by the five permanent members and ten elected, non-permanent members. Prior to 1966, there were six elected members, while the permanent members have in essence not changed since the creation of the United Nations in 1945, apart from the representation of China. Elected members hold their place on the council for a two-year term, and half of these places are contested each year. To ensure geographical continuity, a certain number of members is allocated for each of the five UN regional groupings.

Current membership
Permanent members

Non-permanent members

Regional Groups

 African Group: 3 members
 Asia-Pacific Group: 2 members
 Eastern European Group (CEIT, or Countries with Economies in Transition): 1 member
 Latin American and Caribbean Group (GRULAC): 2 members
 Western European and Others Group (WEOG): 2 members; at least one of these must be from Western Europe
In addition, one of the non-permanent members of the council is an Arab country, alternately from the African or Asia-Pacific groups. This rule was added to the system in 1967 for it to be applied beginning with 1968.

Each year the UN General Assembly elects five new members for a two-year term; these elections always begin in October of the year, and continue until the two-thirds majority for the number of countries for each region has been reached. Re-election is allowed, but the term must not be consecutive.

Electoral timetable

* The representative of Arab nations alternates between these two elected spaces.

Previous and future Security Council composition
From 1946 to 1965, the security council included six non-permanent members. The regional grouping at that time was:
 Latin America: 2 members
 Commonwealth of Nations: 1 member
 Eastern Europe: 1 member
 Middle East: 1 member
 Western Europe: 1 member
There were some exceptions to this grouping: Liberia took the place of a Western European country in 1961; the Ivory Coast substituted a member of the Commonwealth in 1964–1965; and the Eastern Europe group included Asian countries from 1956.

As part of a proposed expansion of the Security Council, Brazil, Germany, India and Japan, collectively the Group of 4 or G4 nations, are seeking permanent representation on this body. Italy opposed the expansion of the Security Council through the establishment of the group Uniting for Consensus.

Membership by year

Permanent

Non-permanent (1946–1965)

Non-permanent (1966–present)

List by number of years as Security Council member 
This list contains the 138 United Nations member states so far elected to the United Nations Security Council, including the five permanent members, all listed by number of years each country has so far spent on the UNSC. Of all the members, 6 have so far ceased to exist, leaving the list with 132 modern nations. These, combined with the 61 modern nations that have never been elected to the UNSC to date (see Non-members, below), make up the entirety of the 193 current members of the UN.

Years on the Security Council, including current year where relevant :

Candidates for future membership

The following countries have made known their applications for future United Nations Security Council membership:

Non-members 
As of July 2011, there are currently 193 members of the United Nations and five permanent members of the Security Council. The other ten seats are assigned amongst the remaining 188 members. As a result, many members have never been on the Security Council. The following list is a summary of all countries, currently 61 modern nations and three historical ones, that have never been a member of the United Nations Security Council. The three historical UN members listed are Tanganyika, Zanzibar, and the Federal Republic of Yugoslavia.

See also

 United Nations Regional Groups
 Member states of the United Nations
 List of members of the United Nations Economic and Social Council
 List of members of the United Nations Commission on Human Rights

Notes

References 

Members

United Nations Security Council
members of the United Nations Security Council
members of the United Nations Security Council